Jane Rouse (born 23 April, 1946) is a British sprint canoer who competed in the early 1970s. She was eliminated in the repechages of the K-1 500 m event at the 1972 Summer Olympics in Munich.

References
Sports-reference.com profile

1946 births
Canoeists at the 1972 Summer Olympics
Living people
Olympic canoeists of Great Britain
British female canoeists